Bolbodimyia is a genus of horse flies in the family Tabanidae.

Species
Bolbodimyia atrata (Hine, 1904)
Bolbodimyia bermudezi Tidwell & Philip, 1977
Bolbodimyia bicolor Bigot, 1892
Bolbodimyia brunneipennis Stone, 1954
Bolbodimyia celeroides Stone, 1954
Bolbodimyia dampfi Philip, 1954
Bolbodimyia desescta Enderlein, 1925
Bolbodimyia erythrocephala (Bigot, 1892)
Bolbodimyia galindoi Fairchild, 1964
Bolbodimyia lampros Philip & Floyd, 1974
Bolbodimyia lateralis Kröber, 1930
Bolbodimyia nigra Stone, 1934
Bolbodimyia philipi Stone, 1954

References

Tabanidae
Diptera of North America
Diptera of South America
Taxa named by Jacques-Marie-Frangile Bigot
Brachycera genera